Clotilde Ngouabi née Martin (4 June 1940 –30 October 2019) was a French-born public figure who served as the first First Lady of the Republic of the Congo from 1969 to 1972, as the wife of President Marien Ngouabi.

Biography 
Martin was born in Walscheid, France.  Her father Jean-Baptiste Martin was the lumberjack in the region. After the municipal school, she joined the Troisfontaines glass factory as a worker, before moving to Strasbourg. There she met young Marien Ngouabi, a Congolese student at the Saint-Cyr Special Military School. They married in 1962 and moved to Congo where Ngouabi, promoted to lieutenant, took up his post in the Congolese army before becoming the third president of the Republic of Congo in 1968, and Martin became the First Lady.

References 

1940 births
2019 deaths
People from Moselle (department)
French emigrants to the Republic of the Congo
Republic of the Congo people of French descent
First ladies of the Republic of the Congo